HCIL may refer to:

 Honda Cars India Ltd (HCIL)
 University of Maryland Human–Computer Interaction Lab (HCIL)

See also
 HCI (disambiguation)